Vixen, also known as DC Comics' Vixen, is an American animated web series from executive producers Greg Berlanti, Marc Guggenheim and Andrew Kreisberg, which debuted on August 25, 2015, on The CW's online streaming platform, CW Seed. It is based on the DC Comics character Mari McCabe / Vixen, a costumed superhero crime-fighter with the power to mimic the abilities of any animal that has ever lived on Earth. The series is set in the Arrowverse, the same fictional universe as Arrow, The Flash, Supergirl and Legends of Tomorrow. In January 2016, the series was renewed for a second season, which premiered on October 13, 2016.

Premise
After her parents were killed in Africa by local corruption, Mari McCabe inherits her family's Tantu Totem, gaining the powers of the animal kingdom, using them to fight as Vixen to stop threats like those that claimed her family.

Cast and characters

Main
 Megalyn Echikunwoke as Mari McCabe / Vixen:
 Born in an African village near the river of Zambezi but raised in the United States, Mari is orphaned at a young age and inherits her family's mystical Tantu Totem, allowing her to access the powers of the animal kingdom. Kimberly Brooks voices a young Mari.
 Neil Flynn as Chuck McCabe: Mari's foster father.
 Sean Patrick Thomas as Professor Macalester: A university professor under Kuasa's employ.
 Anika Noni Rose as Kuasa: Mari's older sister who seeks to obtain the Totem for herself.

Recurring
 Carlos Valdes as Cisco Ramon: A mechanical engineer at S.T.A.R. Labs who assists Barry Allen. Valdes reprises his role from The Flash.
 Grant Gustin as Barry Allen / Flash: A Central City superhero with super speed. Gustin reprises his role from The Flash.
 Stephen Amell as Oliver Queen / Arrow / Green Arrow: A Starling City vigilante archer. Amell reprises his role from Arrow.
 Emily Bett Rickards as Felicity Smoak: A friend and partner of Oliver Queen. Rickards reprises her role from Arrow.
 Hakeem Kae-Kazim as Benatu Eshu: A former general responsible for destroying Mari's village, seeking Zambezi's lost totems.
 Katie Cassidy as Laurel Lance / Black Canary: A Star City attorney-turned-vigilante and a member of Oliver Queen's team. Cassidy reprises her role from Arrow.
 Brandon Routh as Ray Palmer / Atom: A scientist, inventor, businessman and CEO of Palmer Technologies who developed a power-suit that is now capable of shrinking. Routh reprises his role from Arrow.

Guest
 Kari Wuhrer as Patty McCabe: Mari's deceased foster mother.
 Franz Drameh as Jefferson Jackson / Firestorm: A former high school athlete whose pro career was derailed by an injury who now works as an auto mechanic and serves as half of the character Firestorm with Martin Stein. Drameh reprises his role from The Flash.
 Victor Garber as Martin Stein / Firestorm: A nuclear physicist focused on transmutation, who is also half of the character Firestorm with Jefferson Jackson. Garber reprises his role from The Flash.
 Toks Olagundoye as Esi: Mari's deceased biological mother.

Episodes

Season 1 (2015)

Season 2 (2016)

Development
In January 2015, The CW announced that a six-episode animated web-series centered on Vixen from Marc Guggenheim would be debuting on CW Seed in late 2015, and would be set in the Arrowverse with Arrow and The Flash. In total, the six episodes encompass one 30-minute story. The series, described as an "origin story", is set in Detroit, Michigan and "prominently" features characters from Arrow and The Flash. Keto Shimizu and Brian Ford Sullivan, writers on Arrow, also serve as writers for Vixen. On adding Vixen to the established universe, Guggenheim said, "Vixen's such a great character. First of all, she represents magic, which is an area that we haven't explored on either of the two shows just yet. One thing we're always saying is, Flash is very different from Arrow, Arrow is very different from Flash. If Arrow is crime and The Flash is science, Vixen has a big magic component." Guggenheim also talked about why the series originated as animation, saying, "One of the things we can do in animation is really push the envelope in a way that we can't on either of the two shows. So there's a much larger production value. We're taking advantage of the animated form."

At the 2015 San Diego Comic-Con International, it was revealed that the series would debut on August 25, 2015, with new episodes debuting weekly. In July 2015, Guggenheim revealed the series takes place around episode S03E15 and S03E16 of Arrow, saying, "We were shooting [episode] S03E14 [of Arrow] when we wrote Vixen so we sort of tied it to the continuity not of when it ultimately came out because that would require us projecting very, very far into the future, but we just committed to our timeline of around when we were writing it. We knew, of course, at that point that Oliver would be going off to the League of Assassins and changing his costume as a result, so this takes place just right before that." Blake Neely, composer of Arrow and The Flash, composed the music for Vixen along with Nathaniel Blume. In January 2016, CW President Mark Pedowitz announced that The CW had renewed Vixen for a second season of six episodes, again totaling about a half-hour of content. Pedowitz also stated he regretted not airing the entire series as a half-hour special on The CW, something he hoped to do with season two. In January 2017, in terms of renewing Vixen for a third season, Pedowitz said, "We haven't had that discussion, but based on the success of [the second] season I have no reason why not to." The entire series made its broadcast debut on The CW on August 30, 2017.

Home media
In February 2017, Warner Bros. announced Vixen: The Movie for release on digital download on May 8, 2017, and on Blu-ray and DVD on May 23, 2017. The release sees the first two seasons combined into a single story, with 15 minutes of never-before-seen content. Bonus features on the release include the Justice League Unlimited episodes "Hunter's Moon" and "Grudge Match" and a new featurette.

Reception

IGN's Jesse Schedeen gave the series a 7.3/10, praising the action sequences, the animation and the tone, saying the series "finds its niche in the Flash/Arrow-verse". Schedeen criticized the short run time and the voice acting of some actors, particularly those crossing over from the live-action shows, saying "There's a certain stiffness and even slowness to Stephen Amell's Ollie, Grant Gustin's Barry and  Carlos Valdes' Cisco that isn't present in live-action. This is especially apparent whenever the characters launch into witty banter with each other." Oliver Sava of The A.V. Club gave the series a "B+" rating.

In 2017, Vixen was nominated for the Golden Reel Award for Outstanding Achievement in Sound Editing – Computer Episodic (Webisode).

Arrowverse

Guggenheim stated that if the series was successful, a live-action series centered on the character could be possible. Echikunwoke appeared as the character on Arrow during the fourth-season episode "Taken," in which Mari aided Oliver Queen and his team in rescuing his kidnapped son. After Vixen's appearance on Arrow, Pedowitz reiterated again that it would be possible for the character to spin out to her own live-action series, or potentially join the characters on Legends of Tomorrow. It was originally intended for Echikunwoke to reprise her role in the second season of Legends of Tomorrow, but she was unable to do so due to previous commitments. Maisie Richardson-Sellers was ultimately cast to portray Amaya Jiwe, the grandmother of McCabe who also operated as Vixen. Kuasa appears throughout the third season of Legends of Tomorrow, portrayed by Tracy Ifeachor, while Chuck McCabe appears in the episode "I, Ava" and is portrayed by Eli Gabay. The events of the season end up retroactively changing the continuity of Vixen, resulting in an altered timeline where Zambesi was never destroyed, and Mari shares the Vixen mantle with Kuasa.

References

External links
 
 

 
2010s American adult animated television series
2010s American black cartoons
2015 American television series debuts
2016 American television series endings
American adult animated action television series
American adult animated adventure television series
American adult animated superhero television series
American adult animated web series
American animated web series
American animated action television series
American animated adventure television series
American animated superhero television series
American black superhero television shows
English-language television shows
Animated television series about orphans
Television shows set in Ghana
Television shows set in Detroit
Television series by Warner Bros. Animation
Adult animated television shows based on DC Comics
Television series by Blue Ribbon Content
Television series created by Marc Guggenheim